Richard Hovey (May 4, 1864 – February 24, 1900) was an American poet. Graduating from Dartmouth College in 1885, he is known in part for penning the school Alma Mater, Men of Dartmouth.

Biography
Hovey was born in Normal, Illinois, the son of Major General Charles Edward Hovey and Harriet Spofford Hovey. He grew up in North Amherst, Massachusetts, and in Washington, D.C., before attending Dartmouth. His first volume of poems was privately published in 1880.

He collaborated with Canadian poet Bliss Carman on three volumes of "tramp" verse: Songs from Vagabondia (1894), More Songs from Vagabondia (1896), and Last Songs from Vagabondia (1900), the last being published after Hovey's death.  Hovey and Carman were members of the "Visionists" social circle along with F. Holland Day and Herbert Copeland, who published the "Vagabondia" series.

Some twenty-nine poets have attempted to write sequels for Byron's Don Juan. Hovey was one of them. Samuel Chew praised Hovey's “Canto XVII” in his book To the End of the Trail. “This is one of the most convincing reproductions of the spirit and movement of Byron's verse that I have ever come across.  It is supposed to be written by Byron in Hades. The poet refuses to take up the poem at the point at which Death had cut him short.—

Southey’s forgotten; so is Castlereagh;
But there are fools and scoundrels still today.

In the sequel we hear nothing of Juan; the satire is expended upon current affairs. Byron is full of curiosity as to events on earth:

I’ve such a next-day’s thirst for information,
I’d even be content to read the Nation. 

He died after undergoing minor surgery for a varicocele in 1900.

Selected poems
 Sea Gypsy by Richard Hovey
 When We Are Dead by Richard Hovey
 John Keats
 To a Friend
 Philosophy
 The Old Pine
 In Memoriam
 Squab Flights
 Kronos
 College Days
 Dante Gabriel Rossetti
 The South

References

External links

 The Cambridge History of English and American Literature
 Biography of Richard Hovey
 
 
 
 Dartmouth Lyrics by Richard Hovey at Making Of America Books
 Poems of Richard Hovey
 Illinois State University Hovey Memorial, 1931
 Richard Hovey - Pantagraph (Bloomington, IL newspaper)
 The Richard Hovey Collection at Dartmouth College Library

1864 births
1900 deaths
Dartmouth College alumni
Poets from Washington, D.C.
People from Amherst, Massachusetts
People from Normal, Illinois
Poets from Massachusetts
19th-century American poets
American male poets
19th-century American male writers